Canto is the third album by fado singer Carminho. It was released in 2014 by Warner Music Portugal. The album peaked at No. 1 on the Associação Fonográfica Portuguesa chart and was certified as a platinum album.

Track listing
 A ponte [3:05]
 Saia Rodada [3:38]	
 Ventura [3:16]
 Porquê [2:19]
 Chuva no mar [3:24]
 Contra a maré [2:50]
 Andorinha [2:29]
 O sol, eu e tu [3:32]
 Na ribeira deste rio [3:29]
 Espera [2:51]	
 Vou-te contar [4:03]
 Destino [2:46]
 Vem [3:35]
 A Canção [4:52]

Bonus tracks
 Ventura (Versão Jaques Morelenbaum Solo)	
 Carvoeiro	
 História Linda (De Carlos Paião)

References

Carminho albums
2014 albums
Portuguese-language albums
Warner Music Group albums